The Günther Laukien Prize is a prize presented at the European Nuclear Magnetic Resonance Conference "to recognize recent cutting-edge experimental NMR research with a high probability of enabling beneficial new applications". The prize was established in 1999 in memoriam to Günther Laukien, who was a pioneer in NMR research. The prize money of $20,000 is financed by Bruker, the company founded by Laukien. The recipients of the Günther Laukien Prize have been:

 2022 Michael Garwood
 2021 Gareth Morris
 2020 Simon Duckett, Konstantin Ivanov, and Warren S. Warren
 2019 Geoffrey Bodenhausen, and Christian Griesinger 
 2018 Gerhard Wagner
 2017 Kurt Zilm and Bernd Reif
 2016 Robert S. Balaban and Peter van Zijl
 2015 Arthur Palmer III
 2014 Marc Baldus, Mei Hong, Ann McDermott, Beat H. Meier, Hartmut Oschkinat, and Robert Tycko
 2013 Clare Grey
 2012 Klaes Golman and Jan Henrik Ardenkjaer-Larsen
 2011 Daniel Rugar, John Mamin, and John Sidles
 2010 Paul Callaghan
 2009 Daniel Weitekamp
 2008 Malcolm Levitt
 2007 Robert G. Griffin
 2006 Thomas Szyperski, Eriks Kupce, Ray Freeman, and Rafael Bruschweiler
 2005 Stephan Grzesiek
 2004 Lewis E. Kay
 2003 Jacob Schaefer
 2002 Ad Bax, Aksel Bothner-By and James Prestegard
 2001 Peter Boesiger, Klaas Prüßmann and Markus Weiger
 2000 Lucio Frydman
 1999 Konstantin Pervushin, Roland Riek, Gerhard Wider, and Kurt Wuthrich

See also

 List of physics awards

References

External links
European Nuclear Magnetic Resonance Conference

Physics awards
American science and technology awards
Nuclear magnetic resonance